Disney Princess Tea Party is a CD containing new Disney songs sung by the Disney Princesses.  It is the audio soundtrack for the DVD of the same name.

The album was released on February 8, 2005, by Walt Disney Records.

Track listing

	"Perfect Princess Tea" (Susan Egan)	2:04
	"Every Girl Can Be a Princess" (Tami Tappan Damiano)	2:23
	"I Just Love Getting Dressed for Tea" (Jodi Benson)	2:29
	"So Very Glad You're Here" (Susan Egan)	2:39
	"Manners and Etiquette" (Jodi Benson)	3:04
	"The Way to Bake (A Delicious Cake)" (Melissa Disney)	2:25
	"Musical Chairs" (Lea Salonga)	2:33
	"Cups and Saucers" (Lea Salonga)	2:36
	"The Princess Dance" (Tami Tappan Damiano, Susan Egan, Jodi Benson, Melissa Disney & Leslie French)	4:57
 "Waiting for My Prince" (Leslie French)	2:54
 "Happy Birthday, Princess!" (Jodi Benson)	3:01
 "These Moments We Share" (Judy Kuhn)	3:27
 "If You Can Dream" (from Disney Princess: The Ultimate Song Collection - Susan Stevens Logan, Christie Houser, Jodi Benson, Paige O'Hara, Judy Kuhn & Lea Salonga) 3:50

External links
[ Disney Princess Tea Party] at Allmusic

Tea Party
2005 soundtrack albums
Children's music albums
Walt Disney Records soundtracks